"Temple of the Cat" is the third single by Ayreon, released on 2000, from the album  Universal Migrator Part 1: The Dream Sequencer. It was re-released on 2001, containing an acoustic version of the song, and the song, "Nature's Dance", from "the Final Experiment".

Music 
This song makes reference to the Mayan civilization and Maya mythology, taking place circa the 8th century. According to Arjen Lucassen, it speaks especially about the Jaguar Temple and the city of Tikal. Certain samples used on the song come from an authentic Maya festival. Vocals on this song were provided by Jacqueline Govaert.

Arjen has stated that, despite enjoying Jacqueline's vocal work, "Temple of the Cat" is his least favorite Ayreon song.

Track listing

Personnel 
Arjen Lucassen - vocals, guitar, Bass, Keyboard, Synthesizer.
Jacqueline Govaert - Vocals
Rob Snijders - drums

References

External links
Temple of the Cat page at Ayreon's official website
Ayreon official website

2000 singles
Ayreon songs
2000 songs
Songs about North America
Songs about South America
Songs about cats